Mongolia Energy Corporation Limited (abb. MEC) is a mining and energy development holding company operating in Mongolia and Xinjiang in northwestern China. It was incorporated in Bermuda and listed on the Hong Kong Stock Exchange. MEC became a constituent to the MSCI Hong Kong Index from June 2008.

The company was criticised in 2008 as a China Concepts Stock, which had no real profit; its share price was only based on market speculation. The company was also criticised that it bought a private jet in 2005 by recapitalisation. The jet was sold in 2007.

History 
Mongolia Energy Limited was listed on the Stock Exchange of Hong Kong in 2007 through the transaction by which technology company New World Cyberbase, listed at the Hong Kong Stock Exchange since 1972, acquired all assets of Mongolia Energy Limited and renamed itself Mongolia Energy. In the 2007–2008 fiscal year, MEC acquired  of concession areas for coal, ferrous and non-ferrous metal resources in western Mongolia. The acquisition was approved by MEC's shareholders in April 2007. In May 2007, MEC acquired  of coal, ferrous and non-ferrous metal resources concessions at Gants Mod in western Mongolia. In September 2007, MEC inked a co-operation deal with COSCO on intended transport guarantees. In December 2007, MEC acquired 20% stake of  oil and gas exploratory concession areas in western Mongolia, and the deal is at the feasibility study stage. To explore and develop this concession, MEC cooperates with CNPC Daqing Petroleum.

In March 2008, the company acquired a stake in a multi-metals project with explored tungsten and tin resources at Ruoqiang County in Xinjiang Province, China to be completed in mid-2009.

During the 2008–2009 fiscal year, MEC continued its acquisitions. This was followed by acquisition of 25% of a resources corporation working on 2 billion tonnes of coal resources concession in Xinjiang providing MEC with 20% interest under this and other potential projects. In September 2008, MEC acquired 20% interest of over 1.18 million hectares oil and gas concessions in Southern Mongolia under a contested international bid of Ergel XII petroleum block.

Operations 
MEC, through its subsidiaries, engages in the acquisition, exploration, and mining of concessions of coal, ferrous and non-ferrous metals, and oil and gas resources in Mongolia and Xinjiang, China.

Starting from mid-2009, the company plans to produce 3 million tons of coking coal a year and increase the production to 8 million tons per year by 2012.

See also

Coal power in China

References

External links 
 Mongolia Energy Corporation

Coal companies of China
Coal companies of Mongolia
Mining companies based in Xinjiang
Energy companies of Hong Kong
Energy companies established in 1972
Non-renewable resource companies established in 1972
1972 establishments in Hong Kong
Companies listed on the Hong Kong Stock Exchange
Former New World Development subsidiaries